The archbishop of Canterbury is the "Primate of All England" (the "first bishop" of England), effectively serving as the head of the established Church of England and, symbolically, of the worldwide Anglican Communion. From the 6th century to the 16th century, the archbishops of Canterbury were in full communion with the Bishops of Rome, the Popes. Eighteen archbishops have been canonised by the Roman Catholic Church. During the English Reformation the English church broke away from the authority of the Pope, at first temporarily, later permanently, recognising only the English monarch as a source of superior temporal authority.

In the Middle Ages there was considerable variation in the nomination procedure of the archbishop and other bishops. At various times the nomination was made by the Canons of Canterbury Cathedral, the English monarch, or the Pope. Since the Reformation, the church is explicitly a state church and nomination is legally that of the British crown; today it is made in the name of the monarch by the prime minister of the United Kingdom, from a shortlist of two selected by the Crown Nominations Commission, an ad hoc committee.

Today the archbishop has four main roles:
He is the diocesan bishop of the Diocese of Canterbury, which covers the east of the County of Kent and the extreme north-east of Surrey. Founded by Augustine of Canterbury in 597, it is the oldest bishopric in the English church. The main duties of this role are delegated to the suffragan Bishop of Dover (who in this capacity is called the "Bishop in Canterbury").
He is the metropolitan bishop of the Province of Canterbury, encompassing 30 dioceses in the southern two-thirds of England. The remaining 14 dioceses in the north of England fall within the Province of York, under the authority of the archbishop of York. Four dioceses in Wales were under the Province of Canterbury until they were transferred to the dis-established Church in Wales in 1920.
As "Primate of All England", he is the chief "religious" figure in the Church of England (senior to the archbishop of York, who is styled the "Primate of England"). The British sovereign is the supreme governor of the Church of England.
As symbolic head of the Anglican Communion, the archbishop is recognised as primus inter pares ("first among equals") of all Anglican primates.

Heraldry
Much heraldry relating to archbishops of Canterbury is displayed in the church of St Mary-at-Lambeth in London, near to Lambeth Palace the London seat of the archbishops.

List of archbishops

Old English period

After the Norman conquest

After the Elizabethan Settlement

Assistant bishops
Those who have assisted the diocesan archbishop have included:

Two coadjutors – called Bishop of St Martin's — to Saxon archbishops:
1035–1038: Eadsige, who succeeded as Archbishop
 (d.): Godwin (Bishop of St Martin's)
Lanfranc declared that appointments to that See would cease, and the Bishop of Rochester would deputise instead.

1044–1048 (res.): Siward (Abbot of Abingdon), coadjutor-archbishop/suffragan-bishop, probably titular Bishop of Uppsala
15 July 1469?: Henry (Bishop of Ioppe), consecrated to the titular See of Ioppe (i.e. Jaffa)
1469: Thomas Scrope, absentee Bishop of Dromore and assistant Bishop of Norwich (1450–1477)
1480: William Westkarre, Prior of Mottisfont, titular Bishop of Zeitun and assistant Bishop of Winchester (1457–1486)

Modern assistant bishops have included:
19281939 (d.): Arthur Knight, Rector of Lyminge and former Bishop of Rangoon
19351941 (ret.): Edward Bidwell, Vicar of Sellindge and former Bishop of Ontario
19421955 (ret.): Basil Roberts, Warden of St Augustine's College and former Bishop of Singapore
19601961 (res.): Denis Hall, Vicar of Thornton Heath and former Assistant Bishop on the Niger
19941997 (res.): David Evans, Gen. Sec. of SAMS and former Bishop in Peru

Notes
 All start dates are consecration dates, unless otherwise noted.
 All end dates are death dates, unless otherwise noted.
 He was not consecrated until 15 January 1245.

References

Specific

General

External links
Archbishop of Canterbury website
List of Archbishops of Canterbury

History of the Church of England
Canterbury
Archbishops of Canterbury
Archbishops of Canterbury
Canterbury
 
History of the London Borough of Lambeth
Canterbury